A prairie is a type of temperate grassland.

Prairie may also refer to:

Places

Australia
 Prairie, Queensland
 Prairie, Victoria

Canada
 The Prairies, or Canadian Prairies, the provinces of Alberta, Saskatchewan, and Manitoba
 Prairies Ecozone, a region in the southern areas of Canada's prairie provinces

United States
 Prairie, Alabama
 Prairie, Illinois
 Prairie, Indiana
 Prairie, Mississippi
 Prairie, Washington

Arts and entertainment
 The Prairie, an 1827 novel by James Fenimore Cooper
 The Prairie (film), a 1947 American Western, an adaptation of Cooper's novel
 Prairie Dawn, a Sesame Street character
 Prairie, a character in the video game Mega Man ZX

Transportation
 2-6-2, or Prairie, a type of steam locomotive
 Nissan Prairie, an automobile
 USS Prairie, two ships of the US Navy

Other uses
 Prairie School, an architectural style
 The Prairie School, a preK-12 private school in Wind Point, Wisconsin, US

See also
 La Prairie (disambiguation)
 Prairie High School (disambiguation)
 Prairie Mountain, Washington, US
 Prairie Mountain (Alberta), Canada
 Prairie River (disambiguation)
 Prairie Township (disambiguation)